Normandie (D651) is an Aquitaine-class frigate of the French Navy. The Aquitaine class were developed from the FREMM multipurpose frigate program.

Development and design 
In November 2005 France announced a contract of €3.5 billion for development and the first eight hulls, with options for nine more costing €2.95 billion split over two tranches (totaling 17).

Following the cancellation of the third and fourth of the s in 2005 on budget grounds, requirements for an air-defence derivative of the FREMM called FREDA were placed – with DCNS coming up with several proposals. Expectations were that the last two ships of the 17 FREMM planned would be built to FREDA specifications; however, by 2008 the plan was revised down to just 11 FREMM (9 ASW variants and 2 FREDA variants) The 11 ships would cost €670 million (~US$760m) each in FY2014, or €860m (~US$980m) including development costs. In 2015, the total number of ASW variants was further reduced to just six units, including Normandie.

Construction and career 
Normandie was developed as part of a joint Italian-French program known as FREMM, which was implemented to develop a new class of frigates for use by various European navies. Constructed from 2014. On 1 February 2018, the frigate Normandie was launched. Originally, the name Normandie was to be allocated to an earlier ship of the class that had been launched in 2012. However, she was sold to Egyptian Navy in 2015 and renamed .

Armed with a partial crew of 75 sailors, the ship carried out its first sea trials in March 2019 under the responsibility of the Directorate General for Armament. Unlike previous ASW variants of the FREMM class, Normandie and its sister ship  are fitted with SYLVER A50 launch cells (instead of SYLVER A43) able to accommodate larger Aster 30 surface-to-air missiles. This provides both ships with a potentially enhanced area air defence capability, though both vessels still lacked both the boosted variant of the Herakles multi-function radar (which was necessary to accommodate the full range of Aster 30) as well as a complementary fire control radar.

Normandie conducted her first ever sea trial off the coast of Lorient on 15 March 2019.

On 6 February 2021, Normandie successfully fired her Aster 30 missile.

Normandie was part of Clemenceau 22 led by the aircraft carrier .

References 

2018 ships
Aquitaine-class frigates
Ships built in France